Cedric Prys-Roberts is emeritus professor of anaesthesia at the University of Bristol. He was president of the Royal College of Anaesthetists from 1994 to 1997.

References 

Presidents of the Royal College of Anaesthetists
British anaesthetists
Academics of the University of Bristol
Living people
Year of birth missing (living people)